Lhatu Wangchuk (born December 15, 1951)  was a UN Ambassador from Bhutan, having assumed that office in January 2009.  He served in this position until January 2014, being replaced by Kunzang Namgyel.

Career
Wangchuk had served earlier as an ambassador to Bangladesh between 1998 and 2001, and was the tourism director general of Bhutan.

United Nations
In 2011, Wangchuk authored a UN resolution establishing "Gross National Happiness" as a human development indicator (HDI), alongside traditional measures such as Gross National Income. The motion was eventually backed by 66 co-sponsors and was brought into the UN agenda.

References

External links
 Bhutan Spreads Happiness to the UN BBC article
 http://www.bbc.co.uk/russian/international/2011/07/110722_bhutan_happiness_index_un.shtml
 http://korrespondent.net/world/1242353-butan-predlozhil-oon-vvesti-indeks-schastya
 http://telegraf.by/2011/07/butan-predlojil-oon-vvesti-indeks-schastya
 http://finance.bigmir.net/news/economics/34435-Korrespondent-Korolevstvo-schastya-Bytan-ydivlyaet-mir-svoei-sistemoi-cennostei
 http://www.trust.ua/news/47369.html

1951 births
Living people
Bhutanese politicians
Ambassadors of Bhutan to Bangladesh